The 2015–16 Úrvalsdeild karla was the 65th season of the Úrvalsdeild karla, the top tier basketball league in Iceland. The season started on October 15, 2015 and ended on April 29, 2016. KR defended its title by defeating Haukar 3–1 in the Finals.

Competition format
The participating teams first played a conventional round-robin schedule with every team playing each opponent once "home" and once "away" for a total of 22 games. The top eight teams qualified for the championship playoffs whilst the two last qualified were relegated to Division 1.

Regular season

Playoffs

Awards
All official awards of the 2016–17 Úrvalsdeild karla season.

Domestic MVP

Source:

Foreign MVP

Source:

Playoffs MVP

Source:

Domestic All-First Team

Source:

Coach of the Year

Source:

Defensive Player of the Year

Source:

Young Player of the Year

Source:

References

External links
Official Icelandic Basketball Federation website

Icelandic
Lea
Úrvalsdeild karla (basketball)